The Umbrian regional election of 2000 took place on 16 April 2000.

Maria Rita Lorenzetti (Democrats of the Left) was elected President of Umbria, defeating Maurizio Ronconi (Christian Democratic Centre) by a landslide.

Results

Source: Ministry of the Interior

Elections in Umbria
2000 elections in Italy